The Göktürk civil war or Turkic interregnum was a number of political crises in the Turkic Khaganate first between 583 and 603, which resulted in the split of the khaganate into Western and Eastern.

Background

The Turkic Khaganate was an empire stretching between the Manchuria and the Black Sea. The name of the ruling clan was Ashina. The khagans were appointed by the kurultay (council of tribe leaders), normally from the sons, brothers of nephews of the last ruler.

Beginning of the interregnum

In 581, the fourth khagan, Taspar Qaghan, died. There were four claimants to the throne. The personal and regnal names are shown below:

Bumin founded the dynasty and was followed in succession by his three sons: Issik, Muqan and Taspar. Prince Anlo was Taspar Qaghan's son, Talopien (Apa Qaghan) and Shetu (Ishbara Qaghan) were Taspar's nephews, while Tien-chueh (Tardu) was Taspar's cousin. (see Göktürk family tree)

Before dying, Taspar Qaghan had announced his preference for Apa Qaghan (then called Talopien) to succeed him instead of his son Anlo, although he had no right to determine the succession. During the kurultay after Taspar's death, Ishbara (then called Shetu), who was also a claimant, saw that he had no chance and supported the pacifist Anlo against Apa on the ground that Apa's mother was not of noble birth. He threatened the kurultay that in case of Apa's election he would revolt. Thus the kurultay appointed Anlo as the new khan. However Anlo's regency was short-lived because of the reaction of Apa's partisans. Anlo quickly renounced the title on behalf of his powerful ally Shetu (Ishbara) who became the khan with the regnal name Ishbara Qaghan.

Partition
Ishbara Qaghan held the center, residing in the holy forest Ötüken in modern-day central Mongolia. Tardush held the far west in what was becoming the Western Turkic Khaganate. The third khagan was Anlo, who controlled the region around the Tuul River near Ulaanbaatar. Apa Qaghan, was sovereign in the northern territories.

Civil war
In 584, Ishbara Qaghan raided Apa Qaghan's territory and killed the Apa Qaghan's mother. Apa Qaghan took refuge in the west and allied himself with its powerful ruler Tardu. Both Tardu and his brother Tamgan (Turksanf), the ruler of the Volga river area, supplied him with troops. Ishbara Qaghan wasn't able to compete with this force, and accepted the suzerainty of the Sui dynasty to protect himself. With Sui support he was able to capture Apa Khagan's family members. Apa Qaghan once again escaped west and settled in the Poykent near Bukhara (in modern Uzbekistan). However, in his new territory, the former alliance broke and he lost the support of Tardu because of the disagreement over the control of the Silk Road. In 587, both Ishbara Qaghan and Apa Qaghan died.

Aftermath
After Ishbara and Apa died the east was held by Ishbara's brother Bagha Qaghan (587-89) and Ishbara's son Tulan Qaghan (589-99), while the west remained under Tardush (587-603). After Tulan's death Tardush briefly reunified east and west, but after 603 the two halves were definitely separated.

End of the first khaganate
There was a power vacuum between 630 and 682 after the Eastern Khaganate was conquered in 630 and the Western Khaganate in 657 by the Tang dynasty. Although Ashina princes such as Ashina Jiesheshuai did try to restore Turkic Khaganate in 639, and Ashina Funian in 681 they both failed. In 645, Chebi Khan restored Turkic Khaganate from 645 until 650. It was subsequently annexed by Tang. In 682 the Göktürks regained their independence and established the Second Turkic Khaganate. Ashina Qutlugh was enthroned with the title Ilterish Qaghan.

See also
 Göktürk Kaghans
 Timeline of the Turks (500–1300)
 Uyghur timeline

References

Military history of the Göktürks
Civil wars involving the states and peoples of Asia
580s
Civil wars of the Middle Ages
Western Turkic Khaganate
Wars of succession involving the states and peoples of Asia